BGMEA Bhaban (BGMEA Building) was a 16-storey building that served as the former headquarters of Bangladesh Garment Manufacturers and Exporters Association and was located in Hatirjheel, Dhaka. The foundation of the building was placed in 1998 by then Prime Minister Sheikh Hasina. In 2006 it was inaugurated by then Prime Minister Khaleda Zia.

Broken order
The building was built illegally on canal land. On 3 April 2011 Bangladesh High Court ordered the building to be demolished. The High Court in its verdict declared ”The BGMEA Bhaban is like a cancer in the Hatirjheel project and if the building is not taken down immediately, it will infect not just Hatirjheel, but the entire city of Dhaka”. A four-member bench of the Appellate Division of the Supreme Court of Bangladesh led by chief justice Surendra Kumar Sinha upheld the verdict of the High Court on 2 June 2016.

Replace
BGMEA's new headquarters shifted to two high-rise buildings in Uttara due to the old building being sealed. The total number of these two buildings is 4 lakh 64 thousand square feet. BGMEA will use 3 lakh square feet of work in this work. In addition to the exhibition center, there is a 750-capacity auditorium, two seminars, and swimming pools for the members of the Bangladesh Garment Manufacturers and Exporters Association.

References

Buildings and structures in Dhaka
Former buildings and structures in Bangladesh
Foreign trade of Bangladesh
2006 in Bangladesh